Genís Montolio Lafuente (born 23 July 1996), sometimes known simply as Genís, is a Spanish footballer who plays for FC Wil in the Swiss Challenge League as a right back.

Club career
Born in Barcelona, Catalonia, Montolio represented FC Barcelona, RCD Espanyol, UE Cornellà as a youth before joining Villarreal CF's academy in 2012. On 9 May 2015, he scored the second goal for the Juvenil A team in a 3–2 routing of Espanyol in the final of Youth Champions Cup.

On 4 February 2017, Montolio made his debut for the reserves by coming as a substitute for Carlos Martínez in a 4–1 victory against UE Llagostera. On 7 December 2017, he made his first team debut for the senior team, playing the whole ninety minutes of a 1–0 defeat against Maccabi Tel Aviv F.C. in the UEFA Europa League.

On 30 January 2018, Montolio moved to the B-side of RCD Espanyol. He signed for another reserve team on 31 August, joining Atlético Levante UD in the third division.

Career statistics

References

External links

1996 births
Living people
Footballers from Barcelona
Spanish footballers
Association football defenders
Segunda División B players
Tercera División players
Villarreal CF C players
Villarreal CF B players
Villarreal CF players
RCD Espanyol B footballers
Atlético Levante UD players
Deportivo Alavés B players
UE Olot players
FC Wil players
Swiss Challenge League players
Spanish expatriate footballers
Expatriate footballers in Switzerland
Spanish expatriate sportspeople in Switzerland